Eugamandus is a genus of longhorn beetles of the subfamily Lamiinae. It was described by Warren Samuel Fisher in 1926.

Species
 Eugamandus brunneus Fisher, 1935 (Synonym of Eugamandus oakleyi?)
 Eugamandus cayamae Fisher, 1926
 Eugamandus darlingtoni Fisher, 1942
 Eugamandus flavipes Fisher, 1935
 Eugamandus jamaicensis Vitali, 2003
 Eugamandus oakleyi Fisher, 1935
 Eugamandus ricarti Micheli, 2003
 Eugamandus schwarzi Fisher, 1926
 Eugamandus tuberculatus Fisher, 1942

References

Acanthocinini